Abduction is a 1975 American thriller film directed by Joseph Zito, produced and written by Kent E. Carroll and based on the novel Black Abductor by Harrison James which has similarities to the Patty Hearst case which it predates. It stars  Gregory Rozakis, David Pendleton and Judith-Marie Bergan and was first released in the U.S. on October 24, 1975.

Premise
The daughter of a rich property developer is kidnapped and held hostage for ransom by a group of radicals. After being brutalised and brainwashed she eventually becomes converted to their cause.

Violence
The movie is violent throughout though the details are largely kept out of shot. The kidnappers beat up Michael, Patricia's boyfriend, when they seize her. Frank tries and fails to rape her on camera and then Dory takes over. The scenes are sent to Patricia's father along with her reading out the kidnappers' demands. Alongside a second set of demands, Patricia is forced to make love with Carol on camera. The police violently interrogate Jake, a friend of Frank, to find out the identities and location of the gang members. In the final scenes, Patricia shoots the police who have broken in to rescue her, showing that she is now part of the group.

Cast

Prescott family and friend
Judith-Marie Bergan - Patricia Prescott
Leif Erickson - Mr. Prescott 
Dorothy Malone - Mrs. Prescott
Andrew Rohrer - Michael, Patricia's boyfriend

Kidnappers
Gregory Rozakis - Frank 
David Pendleton - Dory 
Catherine Lacy - Carol
Presley Caton - Angie

Also credited
Lawrence Tierney - FBI Agent 
Andrew Bloch - Jake, who informed on the kidnappers under police interrogation

Release
The film opened exclusively in New York for two weeks before expanding to Los Angeles and San Francisco.

Reception
The New York Times described this as "bargain-basement movie-making of the least interesting sort, an ineptly produced ripoff of the Patricia Hearst story ... based on a novel that was actually written before the kidnapping". Steve Carlson, on the letterboxd website, commented that this is" plainly scummy little hostage feature that would barely rate a footnote in exploitation-film history if not for that it kicked off the career of Joseph Zito."

Hearst Newspapers refused to run advertisements for the film.

See also
 List of American films of 1975

References

External links
 
 
 

1975 films
1970s thriller drama films
American thriller drama films
American independent films
1970s English-language films
1970s exploitation films
Films about kidnapping
Films about terrorism
Films based on American novels
Films directed by Joseph Zito
1975 independent films
Films à clef
Cultural depictions of Patty Hearst
1975 directorial debut films
1975 drama films
1970s American films